In 1982, the BBC broadcast a made-for-television adaptation of An Inspector Calls based on the 1945 J. B. Priestley play of the same title and directed by Michael Simpson. It starred Bernard Hepton as Inspector Goole, with the younger Birlings played by Sarah Berger, and David Sibley as Eric. It also starred Nigel Davenport as Arthur Birling and Margaret Tyzack as Sybil Birling. Simon Ward played Gerald Croft, Sheila's fiancé, and the part of the maid Edna was acted by Jean Leppard.

References

External links
 An Inspector Calls at the British Film Institute
 

Television series based on plays
1982 television films
1982 films